Matt Knowles (born 8 December 1975) is a rugby league footballer who played at club level for Wigan and Swinton Lions.

Knowles started his career at Wigan, making his début for the club in 1994. He went on to play nine times for the club, including three appearances in the inaugural Super League season. He signed for Swinton Lions in 1997.

References

External links
 Statistics at rugbyleagueproject.org
 Statistics at wigan.rlfans.com

1975 births
Living people
Place of birth missing (living people)
Swinton Lions players
Wigan Warriors players
Rugby league second-rows
Rugby league props